Tyson Walker (born September 18, 2000) is an American college basketball player for the Michigan State Spartans of the Big Ten Conference. He previously played for the Northeastern Huskies.

High school career
Walker played basketball for Christ the King Regional High School in Queens, New York. As a senior, he led his team to a 22–5 record. Walker played a postgraduate season at New Hampton School in New Hampton, New Hampshire. He was considered a three-star recruit by 247Sports and Rivals.

College career

Northeastern
In his freshman season at Northeastern, Walker shared the backcourt with Jordan Roland. On January 2, 2020, he scored a season-high 32 points in a 77–68 win over Elon. As a freshman, Walker averaged 10.4 points, 3.4 assists and 1.8 steals per game, earning Colonial Athletic Association (CAA) All-Rookie Team honors. He was named CAA Rookie of the Week four times. On February 13, 2021, Walker scored a sophomore season-high 36 points in a 76–67 win over Towson. He averaged 18.8 points, 4.8 assists, and 2.4 steals per game as a sophomore, earning First Team All-CAA and Defensive Player of the Year recognition. Walker led the CAA in scoring during conference play and in steals. After his sophomore season, Walker transferred to Michigan State. He chose the Spartans over Maryland, Kansas, Texas, Miami (Florida) and Vanderbilt.

Michigan State
During his junior season, Walker split time at point guard with A. J. Hoggard, though Walker was the better shooter of the two. On December 8, 2021, he scored 15 points and had five rebounds and three assists in a 76–67 win against Minnesota. On February 26, 2022 against Purdue, he hit a go-ahead three pointer with 1.4 seconds left to give Michigan State a 68-65 lead. They would end up holding on and winning the game. Walker averaged 8.2 points and 4.3 assists per game, shooting 47.3 percent from three-point range.

Career statistics

College

|-
| style="text-align:left;"| 2019–20
| style="text-align:left;"| Northeastern
|| 31 || 29 || 30.4 || .448 || .350 || .656 || 2.0 || 3.3 || 1.8 || .2 || 10.4
|-
| style="text-align:left;"| 2020–21
| style="text-align:left;"| Northeastern
| 19 || 19 || 34.8 || .444 || .354 || .772 || 2.9 || 4.8 || 2.4 || .1 || 18.8
|-
| style="text-align:left;"| 2021–22
| style="text-align:left;"| Michigan State
| 36 || 28 || 22.6 || .427 || .473 || .810 || 1.3 || 4.3 || 0.9 || .1 || 8.2
|- class="sortbottom"
| style="text-align:center;" colspan="2"| Career
| 86 || 76 || 28.1 || .440 || .383 || .750 || 1.9 || 4.0 || 1.6 || .1 || 11.3

References

External links
Michigan State Spartans bio
Northeastern Huskies bio

2000 births
Living people
American men's basketball players
Basketball players from New York (state)
Northeastern Huskies men's basketball players
Michigan State Spartans men's basketball players
People from Westbury, New York
Point guards